The 2015 Boston Breakers season, is the club's tenth overall year of existence, sixth consecutive year, and third year as a member of the National Women's Soccer League. They played 20 games, finishing with 4 wins, 3 draws, and 13 losses. They did not qualify for the post-season playoffs, and finished the season at ninth place in a nine team league.

Club

Coaching staff

First-team squad

Competitions

Key

Preseason

Regular season

Standings 

Results summary

Results by round

Squad statistics
Source: NWSL

Key to positions: FW - Forward, MF - Midfielder, DF - Defender, GK - Goalkeeper

See also 
 2015 National Women's Soccer League season
 2015 in American soccer

References

2015 National Women's Soccer League season
American soccer clubs 2015 season
Boston Breakers seasons
2015 in sports in Massachusetts